Moores Branch  is a stream in Bourbon County, Kansas and Vernon County, Missouri.

Moores Branch was named in honor of an early pioneer.

See also
List of rivers of Kansas
List of rivers of Missouri

References

Rivers of Bourbon County, Kansas
Rivers of Vernon County, Missouri
Rivers of Kansas
Rivers of Missouri